Carlos Eduardo Medellín Becerra (born 14 September 1962) is a Colombian lawyer and diplomat and has served as Minister of Justice of Colombia and as Ambassador of Colombia to the United Kingdom.

Minister of Justice and Law
Medellín was appointed Minister of Justice and Law of Colombia by President Ernesto Samper Pizano on 11 January 1996, replacing Néstor Humberto Martínez Neira. Not long after, Medellín recused himself from handling a case pertaining to the Palace of Justice siege because of the personal connection to the case, since his father was a fatal victim of the siege. The Minister of the Interior, Horacio Serpa Uribe, was therefore named Minister of Justice ad hoc.

He was ultimately forced to resign on 21 April 1997 because he was an open supporter not only of opening up the debate for an extradition treaty with the United States, but also of having it implemented retroactively, something both the President and the Minister of the Interior were completely against, and ultimately leading to incompatibility with the Samper administration.

Ambassadorship
On 7 December 2006, Medellín was appointed Ambassador of Colombia to the United Kingdom of Great Britain and Northern Ireland, and Concurrent Non-Resident Ambassador to the Republic of Ireland, and presented his credentials to Queen Elizabeth II in a ceremony at Buckingham Palace on 2 March 2007.

While in office, Guillermo Fernández de Soto, Colombia's Ambassador to the Netherlands resigned, and President Uribe moved quickly to appoint Medellín as new Ambassador pending his return to Colombia to be sworn in, so on 19 November 2007, Medellín resigned his post and returned to Colombia. His nomination for Ambassador to The Hague was a matter of great importance, given the case at the Permanent Court of Arbitration on the sovereignty claims of Colombia over the Archipelago of San Andrés, Providencia and Santa Catalina after Nicaragua presented a dispute case over the territory, and the President believed Medellín's law background would help Colombia's cause in court. But suddenly, latter that month, Medellín turned down both  Ambassadorships, when an article in El Espectador revealed that Carlos Alberto Gaviria Vélez, older brother of José Obdulio Gaviria Vélez (cousin of Pablo Escobar), who was an Advisor to President Uribe, was directly involved with Luis Carlos Molina Yepes, the moneyman involved in planning the assassination of Guillermo Cano Isaza, Medellín's father-in-law. His resignation was coupled with an earlier one from the Anticorruption Czar, Rodrigo Lara Restrepo, who resigned because José Obdulio Gaviria Vélez had deliberately lied to him about an article published by the Miami based El Nuevo Herald, where they discussed the death of his father, Rodrigo Lara Bonilla. The result of the resignations, both linked to the President's advisor, created a political storm in Colombia.

Personal life
His father was a Magistrate in the Supreme Court of Colombia and was held hostage and allegedly killed by M-19 militants during the 1985 Palace of Justice siege. He is married to María José Cano Busquets, daughter of the late Guillermo Cano Isaza, former editor of El Espectador. Together they have three children, María José, Adriana, and Carlos.

References

1962 births
People from Bogotá
Living people
20th-century Colombian lawyers
Ministers of Justice and Law of Colombia
Ambassadors of Colombia to the United Kingdom
Paris 2 Panthéon-Assas University alumni
Colombian politicians